Abul Kalam Shamsuddin (3 November 18974 March 1978) was a journalist, politician and littérateur. He was born at Trishal of Mymensingh.

Early life
Shamsuddin passed HSC from Dhaka College in 1919. Then we went to Ripon College (presently Surendranath College) of Kolkata to gain higher studies. In 1921 he took the Upadhi examination from Gudiya Suvama Vidyayatan. He participated in Khilafat and Non-Cooperation Movement as a student.

Journalism
In 1922, Shamsuddin joined the daily Mohammadi as assistant editor. He also edited the weekly Moslem Jagat, The Musalman, the Daily Soltan, the weekly Mohammadi and Mashik Mohammadi. He joined the daily newspaper called The Azad in 1936. He worked as the editor of the daily from 1940 to 1962. He also was the editor of Daily Pakistan.

Political career
Shamsuddin first came to politics after the Jallianwalla Bagh Massacre in Punjab. He was inspired by Mahatma Gandhi and joined the Indian National Congress. In 1927 he joined the Muslim League. He also took part in the Pakistan Movement after becoming the president of East Pakistan Renaissance Society. He also was the chairman of the Reception Committee of the Renaissance Society Summit at Kolkata in 1944. In 1946 he was elected to the Central Legislative Council. Shamsuddin became a member of Language Committee of East Pakistan Government in 1949.

Involvement in Language Movement
Shamsuddin played an important role during the Language Movement. At that time he was the editor of the leading daily The Azad which supplied true news about the movement. On 22 February 1952 he resigned from the East Bengal Legislative Assembly to protest the police firing of the previous day. Azad also published a special evening edition on that day. According to him the editorial that he wrote to criticize the police firing created massive excitement among the youths.

Literatures
Shamsuddin wrote a number of books. He along with some other writer formed a domestic literature society named Raonok. Shamsuddin was the secretary of this 21 member society of Islamist writers. Amongst them his autobiography Atit Jiboner Smriti is considered as his masterpiece. His other works are:

Podojomi Ba Anabadi Jami (1938)
Trisrota (1939)
Kharataranga (1953)
Drishtikon (1961)
Natun Chin Natun Desh (1965)
Digvijayi Taimur (1965),
Iliad (1967),
Palashi Theke Pakistan (1968),
Atit Diner Smriti (1968)

Awards
Shamsuddin was awarded a number of awards in Pakistan and Bangladesh. In Pakistan he was awarded the Sitara-i-Khidmat in 1961 and Sitara-i-Imtiaz in 1967. In 1969 during the revolution of people he protested against the government and refused his awards for the cause. He received the Bangla Academy Literary Award in 1970. After the independence of Bangladesh, he was honored with the Bangladesh's highest honour Ekushey Padak.

References

External links
 

Bangladeshi politicians
Bangladeshi journalists
1897 births
1978 deaths
Recipients of Sitara-i-Imtiaz
Surendranath College alumni
University of Calcutta alumni
Recipients of the Ekushey Padak
Dhaka College alumni
People from Mymensingh District
Recipients of Bangla Academy Award
20th-century journalists
20th-century Bengalis